Kerr's Miniature Railway was a  gauge railway, a  return ride, adjacent to the Dundee-Aberdeen line in West Links Park Arbroath. It was the oldest miniature railway in Scotland, having first opened for business in 1935. Under its original owner, Matthew Kerr (senior), it was a commercial business but since 1979, when it passed to his son, Matthew Kerr Jnr, it had been run as a non-profit concern.

With the death of Matthew Kerr Jnr, owner of Kerr's Miniature Railway, on 17 April 2006 after a prolonged illness, the future of the railway had been uncertain; however, Kerr's widow and son continued to run the railway with the help of volunteers.

The railway had six locomotives, two of which were steam and built by Herbert Bullock in the 1930s. The railway also operated three miniature vehicles (two buses and a fire engine), which gave rides to children along the Arbroath seafront.

Fares as of 2020 were £2.50 for both adults and children, with trains running weekends from April to end of September and both Easter and Summer local school holidays from 11am to 4pm.

In 2013, an extension to the entrance of West Links Park was planned.

It was announced in August 2020 that, due to falling passenger numbers, the railway would close in early October 2020. The railway closed indefinitely on 11 October 2020.

References

External links
 Kerr's Miniature Railway Website

10¼ in gauge railways in Scotland
Tourist attractions in Angus, Scotland
Miniature railways in the United Kingdom
Transport in Angus, Scotland
Amusement parks in Scotland
Rail transport in Scotland
Entertainment companies established in 1935
Entertainment companies disestablished in 2020
1935 establishments in Scotland
2020 disestablishments in Scotland